Harmeet Singh Baddhan (born 7 September 1992) is a Indian cricketer who played for Mumbai and Tripura before moving to the United States to play Minor League Cricket. He was part of the India Under-19 cricket team in the 2012 ICC Under-19 Cricket World Cup. He is a slow left-arm orthodox bowler who was a member of the Rajasthan Royals squad during the 2013 Indian Premier League.

He was the leading wicket-taker for Tripura in the 2018–19 Vijay Hazare Trophy, with thirteen dismissals in eight matches. In August 2021 he moved to Seattle where he captains the Seattle Thunderbolts in Minor League Cricket.

References

External links

Living people
1992 births
Indian cricketers
Mumbai cricketers
Tripura cricketers
West Zone cricketers
Rajasthan Royals cricketers